Cuacos de Yuste is a municipality in the province of Cáceres and autonomous community of Extremadura, Spain. It is best known for the Monastery of Yuste, where Charles V, Holy Roman Emperor, retired and died.

References

Municipalities in the Province of Cáceres